The following is a chronological list of French artists working in visual or plastic media (plus, for some artists of the 20th century, performance art). For alphabetical lists, see the various subcategories of Category:French artists.  See other articles for information on French literature, French music, French cinema and French culture.

Middle Ages
See also Middle Ages, Gothic architecture, Illuminated manuscript
Gislebertus (12th century), sculptor
Pierre de Montreuil (c.1200–1266), architect
Villard de Honnecourt (13th century), other media
Jean Pucelle (active 1325–28), other media
Jean Malouel (Dutch, worked in Burgundy) (1365-1416), painter
Anastasia (fl. c.1400), manuscript illuminator
Claus Sluter (Dutch, worked in Burgundy from 1395–1406), sculptor
the Limbourg brothers (Pol and Hermann) (Dutch artists working in Burgundy around 1403–1416), other media

Renaissance
See also Renaissance, Francis I of France, Henry II of France, Catherine de' Medici, Henry III of France, Henry IV of France, Louvre, Fontainebleau, Châteaux of the Loire Valley 
Jacques Morel (c.1395–1459), sculptor
Enguerrand Quarton (c.1410–c.1466), painter, miniatures
Henri Bellechose (Flemish born) (active 1415-1440), painter
Simon Marmion (c.1420–1489), illuminations
Jean Fouquet (1420–1481), painter, illuminations
Jean Colombe (1430–1493), illuminations
Michel Colombe (c.1430–1515), sculptor
Nicolas Froment (c.1450–c.1490), painter
Jean Perréal (c.1455–1528), painter, illuminations
Antoine Le Moiturier (active in the 1460s), sculptor
Jean Clouet (c.1485–1541) (Flemish born), painter, miniatures
Jean Duvet (c.1485–c.1570), engraver
 Josse Lieferinxe (active 1493–1508) (Flemish born), painter
Nicolas Dipre (fl. 1495–1532), painter
Jehan Cousin the elder (1500–1593), painter, engraver, sculptor
Ligier Richier (1500–1567), sculptor
Pierre Quesnel (c.1502–1580), painter
Philibert Delorme (or de L'Orme) (1505/1510–1570), sculptor, architectural plans
Pierre Bontemps (1505/1510–after 1562), sculptor
Jean Goujon (c.1510–1565?), sculptor
Bernard Palissy (1510–1590), master potter
Jacques Androuet du Cerceau (c.1510–1585), architectural plans
Jean Juste (active 1515–1530), sculptor
François Clouet (c.1515–1572) (son of Jean Clouet), painter
Pierre Lescot (c.1515–1578), sculptor, architect
Antoine Caron (c.1521–1599), painter
Jean Cousin the Younger (c. 1522–1593), painter
Germain Pilon (c.1535–1590), sculptor
Barthélemy Prieur (c.1536–1616), sculptor
Étienne Dumonstier (1540–1603), painter
Ambroise Dubois (c.1542–1614) (Flemish born), painter
Pierre Dumonstier I (c.1545–c.1610), painter
Thomas de Leu (1560-1612), engraver
Toussaint Dubreuil (c.1561–1602), painter
Léonard Gaultier (c.1561-1641), engraver
Martin Fréminet (1567–1619), painter
Frans Pourbus the younger (1569–1622) (Flemish born), painter
Jacques Bellange (1575–1616) (in Lorraine), engraver
Jean Decourt (active 1570s), painter
François Quesnel (active 1580s), painter
Jacques Patin (active 1580s), engraver
Jean de Beaugrand (1584–1640), lineographer

Seventeenth century
See also French Baroque and Classicism, Louis XIII of France, Cardinal Richelieu, Baroque, Louis XIV of France, Palace of Versailles, Classicism
Daniel Dumonstier (1574–1646), draftsman
Pierre Dumonstier II (1585–1656), draftsman
Claude Deruet (1588–1660) (in Lorraine), painter
Simon Vouet (1590–1649), painter
Jacques Callot (1592–1635) (in Lorraine), engraver
Georges de La Tour (1593–1652), painter
Claude Vignon (1593-1670), painter, printmaker, illustrator
Nicolas Poussin (1594–1665), painter
Antoine Le Nain (before 1600–?), painter
Louis Le Nain (after 1600–?), painter
Nicolas Lagneau (fl c. 1600–c. 1650), draftsman
Abraham Bosse (1602–1676), engraver
Claude Gelée, called Claude Lorrain (1600–1682), painter
Philippe de Champaigne (1602–1674)
Pierre-Antoine Lemoine (1605–1665), still-life painter
Laurent de La Hyre (1606–1565), painter
Mathieu Le Nain (1607–c.1677), painter
Louise Moillon (1610–1696), painter
Pierre Mignard (1612–1695), painter
Gaspard Dughet (1613–1675), painter
André Le Nôtre (1613–1700), landscape architect
Eustache Le Sueur (1616–1655), painter
Sébastien Bourdon (1616–1671), painter
Charles Le Brun (1619–1690), painter, other media
Pierre Paul Puget (1620–1694), sculptor
Guillaume Courtois (1628–1679), painter and etcher
François Girardon (1628–1715), sculptor
Catherine Duchemin (1630–1698), painter
Claude Lefèbvre (1633–1675), painter and engraver
Claudine Bouzonnet-Stella (1636–1697), engraver
Charles de la Fosse (1636–1716), painter
Antoine Coysevox (1640–1720), sculptor
Antoinette Bouzonnet-Stella (1641–1676), engraver
Étienne Allegrain (1644–1736), topographical painter
Jean Jouvenet (1644–1717), painter
François de Troy (1645–1730), painter
Madeleine Boullogne (1646–1710), still life painter
Marie Blancour (fl. 1650–1699), painter
Marie Courtois (c.1655–1703), miniature painter
Nicolas de Largillière (1656–1746), painter
Nicolas Coustou (1658–1733), sculptor
Hyacinthe Rigaud (1659–1743), painter
Antoine Coypel (1661–1722), sculptor
François Desportes (1661–1743), painter

Eighteenth century
See also Palace of Versailles, Louis XV of France, Madame de Pompadour, Rococo, Louis XVI of France, Neoclassicism, Enlightenment, Gobelins. For art criticism, see Denis Diderot
Alexis Simon Belle (1674–1734)
Jean-François de Troy (1679–1752) (son of François), painter
Marie-Anne Horthemels (1682–1727), engraver
Antoine Watteau (1684–1721), painter
Jean-Baptiste van Loo (1684–1745), painter
Jean-Marc Nattier (1685–1766), painter
Jean-Baptiste Oudry (1686–1755), painter
Louise-Magdeleine Horthemels (1686–1767), engraver
François Lemoyne (1688–1737), painter
Nicolas Lancret (1690–1743), painter
Charles-Antoine Coypel (1694–1752), painter, art commentator, and playwright
Jean-Baptiste Pater (1695–1736), painter
Jean-Baptiste-Siméon Chardin (1699–1779), painter
Charles Joseph Natoire (1700–1777), painter
Louis-François Roubiliac (1702–1762), sculptor
Jean-Étienne Liotard (1702–1789), painter
François Boucher (1703–1770), painter, engraver
Maurice Quentin de La Tour (1704–1788), painter
Jean-Baptiste Lemoyne (1704–1778), painter, sculptor
Charles-André van Loo (Carle Van Loo) (1705–1765) (brother of Jean-Baptiste van Loo), painter
Louis-Michel van Loo (1707–1771) (son of Jean-Baptiste van Loo), painter
Jean-Baptiste Pigalle (1714–1785), sculptor
Claude Joseph Vernet (1714–1789), painter
Jean-Baptiste Perronneau (1715–1783), painter
Etienne-Maurice Falconet (1716–1791), sculptor
Joseph-Marie Vien (1716–1809), painter
Charles-Amédée-Philippe van Loo (1719–1795) (son of Jean-Baptiste van Loo), painter
Charles Germain de Saint Aubin (1721–1786), engraver, embroidery designer
Jean-Baptiste Greuze (1725–1805), painter
François-Hubert Drouais (Drouais le fils) (1727–1775), painter
Jean-Baptiste Defernex (1729–1783), sculptor
Jean-Honoré Fragonard (1732–1806), painter
Jean-Jacques Durameau (1733–1796), painter
Hubert Robert (1733–1808), painter, engraver
Marie-Suzanne Giroust (1734–1772), painter
Joseph Ducreux (1735–1802), painter
Étienne de La Vallée Poussin (1735–1802), French history painter and creator of interior decorative schemes
Louis Albert Guislain Bacler d'Albe (1761–1824), painter
Nicolas Bernard Lépicié (1735–1784), painter
Nicolas Benjamin Delapierre (1739–c.1800), painter
Jean Antoine Houdon (1741–1828), sculptor
Jean-Michel Moreau (Moreau the younger) (1741–1814), engraver
Anne Vallayer-Coster (1744–1818), painter
Jacques-Louis David (1748–1825), painter
Claude-Jean-Baptiste Hoin (1750–1817), portrait artist
Jacques-Antoine-Marie Lemoine (1751–1824), portrait and landscape artist
Michel Garnier (1753–1819), painter
Rosalie Filleul (1752–1794), painter
Antoine Berjon (1754–1843),  painter and designer
Jean-Baptiste Regnault (1754–1829)
Élisabeth Vigée Le Brun (1755–1842), painter
Alexandre-Hyacinthe Dunouy (1757–1841), painter known for his landscapes
Pierre Prudhon (1758–1823), painter

Nineteenth century (Romanticism to Impressionism)
See also French Revolution, Napoleon I, Romanticism, Barbizon school, Naturalism, Symbolism, Impressionism, Academic art, Napoleon III of France, Photography, Modernism
Louis-Léopold Boilly (1761–1845), painter
Joseph Nicéphore Niépce (1765–1833), photographer
Adélaïde Dufrénoy (1765–1825), poet and painter from Brittany
Anne-Louis Girodet de Roussy-Trioson (1767–1824), painter
Jean-Baptiste Isabey (1767–1855), painter
Antoine Jean Gros (1771–1835), painter
Pierre Narcisse Guérin (1771–1833), painter
Adélaïde Victoire Hall (1772–1844), painter
Blanche Hennebutte-Feillet (1815–1886), lithographer
Eustache-Hyacinthe Langlois (1777–1837), painter, draftsman
Jean Auguste Dominique Ingres (1780–1867), painter
Étienne Bouhot (1780–1862), painter and art teacher
Alexandre-François Caminade (1783–1862), portraitist and religious painter
François Rude (1784–1855), sculptor
Eugénie Charen (1786–1824), painter
Louis-Jacques Daguerre (1787–1851), photographer
Charles de Steuben (1788–1856), painter active during the Napoleonic Era
Horace Vernet (1789–1863), painter
Jules Robert Auguste (c.1789–1850), painter
Elisa de Lamartine (1790–1863), painter and sculptor
Théodore Géricault (1791–1824), painter
Nicolas Toussaint Charlet (1792–1845), painter
Antoine-Louis Barye (1795–1875), sculptor
Ary Scheffer (1795–1858), painter
Raymond Bonheur (1796–1849), painter
Jean-Baptiste-Camille Corot (1796–1875), painter
Fanny Alaux (1797–1880), painter
Paul Delaroche (1797–1856), painter
Julie Hugo (1797–1865), painter
Eugène Delacroix (1798–1863), painter
Alfred Johannot (1800–1837), painter and engraver
Hippolyte Bellangé (1800–1866), painter
Camille Chantereine (1810–1847), painter
Achille Devéria (1800–1857), painter, engraver
Charles Philipon (1800–1861), caricaturist
Paul Huet (1803–1869), painter
François-Émile de Lansac (1803–1890), painter
Grandville (Jean Ignace Isidore Gérard, called) (1803–1847), engraver
Eugène Isabey (1803–1886), painter
Denis Auguste Marie Raffet (1804–1860), painter
Édouard Viénot (born 1804), painter
Hippolyte Bayard (1807–1887), photographer
Honoré Daumier (1808–1879), painter, lithographer, sculptor
Louis Boulanger (1808–1867), painter
Narcisse Virgile Diaz de la Peña (1808–1878) (born in Spain), painter
Auguste Préault (1809–1879), sculptor
Ignace François Bonhomme (1809–1881), painter
Constant Troyon (1810–1865), painter
Eugène André Oudiné (1810–1875), sculptor, engraver
Jules Dupré (1811–1889), painter
Théodore Rousseau (1812–1867), painter
Boissard de Boisdenier (1813–1866), painter
Charles Jacque (1813–1894), painter
Jean-François Millet (1814–1875), painter
Thomas Couture (1815–1879), painter
Jean-Louis-Ernest Meissonier (1815–1891), painter
Jacques-Eugene Feyen (1815–1908), painter
Charles Marville (1816–1879), painter, engraver, photographer
Antoine Chintreuil (1816–1873), painter
Jean Pierre Alexandre Antigna (1817–1878), painter
François Bonvin (1817–1887), painter
Charles-François Daubigny (1817–1878), painter
Johan Barthold Jongkind (1819–1891) (Dutch, worked in France), painter
Théodore Chassériau (1819–1856), painter
Gustave Courbet (1819–1877), painter
Eugène Fromentin (1820–1876), painter
Nadar (Gaspard Félix Tournachon, called "Nadar") (1820–1910), photographer
Charles Méryon (1821–1868), printmaker (etching)
Rosa Bonheur (1822–1899), painter
Marie Adrien Persac (1823–?), painter, cartographer, architect, civil engineer, photographer
Alexandre Cabanel (1823–1889), painter
Albert-Ernest Carrier-Belleuse (1824–1887), sculptor and painter
Jean-Léon Gérôme (1824–1904), painter
Adolphe Joseph Thomas Monticelli (1824–1886), painter
Théodule Ribot (1824–1891), painter
Eugène Boudin (1824–1898), painter
Pierre Puvis de Chavannes (1824–1898), painter
William-Adolphe Bouguereau (1825–1905), painter
Gustave Moreau (1826–1898), painter
Jean-Baptiste Carpeaux (1827–1875), sculptor
Elie Delaunay (1828–1891), painter
Camille Alfred Pabst (1828–1898), painter
Achille Emperaire (1829–1898), painter and a friend of Paul Cézanne
Lucien Joulin (1842–1878), painter
Gaston de Laperriere (1848–1920), painter
Aimé Morot (1850–1915), painter and son in law of Jean-Léon Gérôme
 (b. 1856), encaustic painter

Nineteenth century (Impressionism to Fauvism)
See also Modern art, Modernism, Impressionism, Post-Impressionism, Les Nabis, Fauvism, Symbolism, Symbolist painters, Art Nouveau, Primitivism
Camille Pissarro (1830–1903), painter
Étienne-Jules Marey (1830–1904), photographer
Édouard Manet (1832–1883), painter
Gustave Doré (1832–1883), engraver
Edgar Degas (1834–1917), painter, sculptor
Pierre Mallet (1836-1898), painter of ceramics
Henri Fantin-Latour (1836–1904), painter
Jules Chéret (1836–1932), painter, other media
Paul Cézanne (1839–1906), painter
François Salle (1839–1899)
Odilon Redon (1840–1916), painter, draftsman, lithographer
Auguste Rodin (1840–1917), sculptor
Claude Monet (1840–1926), painter; a founder of French impressionist painting
Pierre-Auguste Renoir (1841–1919), painter
Frédéric Bazille (1841–1870), painter
Berthe Morisot (1841–1895), painter
Marie Bracquemond (1841–1916), painter
Fernand Pelez (1843–1913), painter
Alexander Louis Leloir (1843–1884), painter
Henri Rousseau ("Le Douanier Rousseau") (1844–1910), painter
Jean Antonin Mercié (1845–1916), sculptor
Jean-Joseph Benjamin-Constant (1845–1902), painter
Gustave Caillebotte (1848–1894), painter
Henri Biva (1848–1929), painter
Jules Bastien-Lepage (1848–1884), painter
Paul Gauguin (1848–1903), painter, sculptor
Henry Lerolle (1848–1929), painter
Eugène Carrière (1849–1906), painter
Pierre Carrier-Belleuse (1851–1932), painter
Vincent van Gogh (1853–1890) (Dutch, worked in France), painter
Charles Angrand (1854–1926), painter
Emilie Jenny Weyl (1855–1934), sculptor 
Henry-Edmond Cross (1856-1910), painter 
Henry Moret (1856–1913), painter 
Eugène Atget (Jean-Eugène Auguste Atget) (1857–1927), photographer
Mathurin Janssaud (1857–1940), painter
Marie Bashkirtseff (1858-1884), painter and sculptor
Georges-Pierre Seurat (1859–1891), painter
Antoine Bourdelle (1861–1929), sculptor
Aristide Maillol (1861–1944), sculptor
Louis Vivin (1861–1936), painter
Antonio de la Gandara (1861–1917), painter
Gaston Bussière (1862–1929), Symbolism movement painter and illustrator
Ernest de Chamaillard (1862–1931), painter
Henri Delavallée (1862–1943), painter
Paul Signac (1863–1935), painter
Camille Bouvagne (1864–1936), painter
René Georges Hermann-Paul (1864–1940), graphic artist, illustrator, painter
William Didier-Pouget (1864–1959), painter
Henri Marie de Toulouse-Lautrec (1864–1901), painter
Paul Sérusier (1864–1927), painter
Paul Ranson (1864–1909), painter
Seraphine Louis (1864–1942), painter
Henri Jourdain (1864–1931), painter, prints or lithographs of landscapes usually by the water
Albert Aurier (1865–1892), poet, art critic and painter devoted to Symbolism
Suzanne Valadon (1865–1938), painter
Félix Vallotton (1865–1925) (Swiss, worked in France), painter, engraver
Jacqueline Marval (1866-1932), the pseudonym for Marie Josephine Vallet, French painter 
Pierre Bonnard (1867–1947), painter
Angèle Delasalle (1867–1941, painter, engraver
Paule Gobillard (1867–1946), painter
Jeanne Itasse-Broquet (1867–1941), sculptor
Ker-Xavier Roussel (1867–1944), painter
Hector Guimard (1867–1942), architect and decorator
Édouard Vuillard (1868–1940), painter
Georges Lacombe (1868–1916), sculptor
Émile Bernard (1868–1941), painter
Henri Matisse (1869–1954), painter, other media
Adolf de Meyer (1869–1949), photographer
Georges d'Espagnat (1870–1950), painter, illustrator, engraver

Twentieth century (pre-World War II)
See also Post-Impressionism, Modern art, Modernism, Cubism, Puteaux Group, Dada, Surrealism
Georges Rouault (1871–1958), painter
Léon Printemps (1871–1945), painter
František Kupka (1871–1957) (Czech, worked in France), painter
Henri-Charles Manguin (1874–1943), painter
Louis Mathieu Verdilhan (1875–1928), painter
Albert Marquet (1875–1947), painter	
Jacques Villon (1875–1963), painter
Constantin Brâncuși (1876–1957) (French, born in Romania), sculptor
Maurice de Vlaminck (1876–1958) (Flemish, worked in France), painter
Raymond Duchamp-Villon (1876–1918), sculptor
Raoul Dufy (1877–1953), painter
Jeanne Baudot (1877–1957), painter
Jean Crotti (1878–1958) (Swiss), painter
Louis Marcoussis (Louis Markus) (1878–1941 or 1883–1941) (Polish, worked in France), painter
Francis Picabia (1879–1953), painter
Maurice Berty (1884-1946), illustrator
André Derain (1880–1954), painter
Joseph Hémard (1880–1961), illustrator
Albert Gleizes (1881–1952), painter, writer, theorist
Henri Le Fauconnier (1881–1946), painter
Jacob Macznik (1905–1945), painter
Fernand Léger (1881–1955), painter
Georges Braque (1882–1963), painter
Auguste Chabaud (1882–1955), painter 
Auguste Herbin (1882–1960), painter
Jean Metzinger (1883–1956), painter, engraver, poet, writer, theorist
Marie Laurencin (1883–1956), painter
Maurice Utrillo (1883–1955), painter
Marie-Renée Ucciani (1883-1963), painter, sculptor
Georges Ribemont-Dessaignes (1884–1974), painter
Jacques Maroger (1884–1962), painter
Robert Delaunay (1885–1941), painter
André Dunoyer de Segonzac (1884–1974), painter
Raymond Wintz (1884–1956), painter
Pierre Brissaud (1885–1964), painter
Roger de La Fresnaye (1885–1925), painter
Robert Antoine Pinchon (1886–1943), French Post-Impressionist painter of the Rouen School (l'École de Rouen)
Amédée Ozenfant (1886–1956), painter
Jean (Hans) Arp (1886–1966), painter, sculptor
Marc Chagall (1887–1985) (born in Belarus), painter
Marcel Duchamp (1887–1968), painter, sculptor, other media
Suzanne Duchamp-Crotti (1889–1963), painter
Anna Quinquaud (1890–1984), explorer and sculptor
Ossip Zadkine (1890–1967) (Russian born), sculptor
Jacques Lipchitz (1891–1973) (born in Lithuania), sculptor
Max Ernst (1891–1976) (German born), painter, sculptor
Thérèse Lemoine-Lagron (1891–1949), painter
Louis Favre (1892–1956), painter, creator of lithographs
Bram van Velde (1892–1981) (Dutch, worked in France), painter
Chaïm Soutine (1894–1943) (born in Belarus), painter
Jacques Henri Lartigue (1894–1986), photographer
Jean Maurice Rothschild (1902–1998), furniture artist, interior designer, muralist
Gen Paul (1895–1975), painter, engraver
Albert Gilles (1895–1979), metal embosser, working with copper
Lucie Bouniol (1896–1988), sculptor, painter
André Masson (1896–1987), painter
René Iché (1897–1954), sculptor, painter
Jean Fautrier (1898–1964), painter
Georges Gimel (1898–1962), painter, engraver, sculptor
Henri Michaux (1899–1984) (Belgian), painter
Brassaï (Gyula Halasz) (1899–1984) (born in Hungary), photographer
Yves Tanguy (1900–1955) (naturalized American), painter

Twentieth century (post-World War II)
See also Modern art 
René Pellos (1900–1998), cartoonist
Madeleine Schlumberger or Marie d’Ailleurs’ (1900–1980), artist, writer
Marcelle Bergerol (1901–1989), painter
Alberto Giacometti (1901–1966) (Swiss, worked in Paris), sculptor, painter
Alfred-Georges Regner (1901–1987), painter, engraver
Jean Dubuffet (1901–1985), painter
Charles Cobelle (1902–1994), painter 
Hans Bellmer (1902–1975) (French, born in Germany), sculptor, photographer, engraver
Victor Brauner (1903–1966) (Romanian), painter
Hans Hartung (1904–1992) (born in Germany), painter
Jean Hélion (1904–1987), painter
Pierre Tal-Coat (1905–1985), painter
Elisa Breton (1906–2000), artist and writer, third wife of French writer and surrealist André Breton
Henri Cadiou (1906–1989), painter
Victor Vasarely (1908–1997) (born in Hungary), painter
Balthus (Balthasar Klossowski de Rola, called "Balthus") (1908–2001) (Polish born), painter
Mario Tauzin (1909–1979)
Andrée Bordeaux-Le Pecq (1910–1973), illustrator
Jacques Nathan Garamond (1910–2001), graphic designer, illustrator, painter
Lucien Hervé (László Elkán) (1910–2007) (born in Hungary), photographer
Othello Radou (1910–2006), painter
Louise Bourgeois (1911–2010) (lived and died in America), sculptor, other media
Ervin Marton (1912–1968), photographer and artist
Wols (1913–1951) (born in Germany), painter
Pierre Wemaëre (1913–2010), painter
Etienne Martin (1913–1995), sculptor
Nicolas de Staël (1914–1955) (French, Russian origin), painter
Gerard Locardi (1915–1998), painter
François Lanzi (1916–1988), painter
Constantine Andreou (1917–2007) (Greek, Brazilian born), painter, sculptor
Marcel Mouly (1918–2008), painter, print maker
Bernard Cathelin (1919–2004), painter
Maurice Boitel (1919–2007), painter
Pierre Soulages (1919–2022), painter
Gabrielle Bellocq (1920–1999), painter
César Baldaccini (called "César") (1921–1998), sculptor
Claude Bonin-Pissarro (1921–2021), painter
Georges Mathieu (1921–2012), painter
Francois Fiedler (1921–2001), painter
Simon Hantaï (1922–2018) (born in Hungary), painter
Paul Crotto (1922–2016), painter, sculptor and printmaker
François Ozenda (1923–1976), painter
Jean Tinguely (1925–1991) (Swiss), sculptor
Robert Filliou (1926–1987), other media
Raymond Hains (1926–2005), other media
Paul Rebeyrolle (1926–2005), painter
François Morellet (1926–2016), painter
Jacques de la Villeglé (1926–2022), other media (ripped posters)
François Dilasser (1926–2012), painter
Georges Badin (1927–2014), painter
Bernard Buffet (1928–1999), painter
Yves Klein (1928–1962), painter
Jacques Rivette (1928–2016), filmmaker
Arman (Armand Fernandez) (1928–2005), sculptor
Gérard Gasiorowski (1930–1986), painter, other media
Niki de Saint-Phalle (1930–2002), sculptor
Alvaro Guillot (1931–2010) (Uruguay/French, died in Santa Fe, New Mexico), abstract realism
Jules Michel (1931–), painter, sculptor
Tomi Ungerer (1931–2019), artist, illustrator
Bernard Rancillac (1931–2021),  painter, sculptor
Jean-Marie Straub (1933–2022) and Danièle Huillet (1936–2006), filmmakers
Lydia Corbett (1934–), artist
Jean-Pierre Yvaral (1934–2002) (son of Victor Vasarely), painter
Jean-Michel Sanejouand (1934–2021), sculptor, painter
Ben Vautier (called "Ben") (1935–), painter, other media
Martial Raysse (1936–), painter
Daniel Buren (1938–), sculptor, painter
Pierre Laffillé (1938–2011), painter
Henri Sert (1938–1964), painter
Gérard Fromanger (1939–2021), painter, other media
Sandra Jayat (c.1939–), painter, poet, author
Nancy Wilson-Pajic (1941–), media artist, feminist artist, installation artist, photographer 
Bernar Venet (1941–) (lives in America), sculptor
Daniel Dezeuze (1942–), other media
Anne Poirier (1942–), painter, other media
Ksenia Milicevic (1942–), painter 
Tania Mouraud (1942–), contemporary artist 
Jean Jacques Surian (1942–), painter and ceramist, lives in Marseilles
Patrick Bokanowski (1943–), filmmaker
Pierre Risch (1943–), painter, lithograph, engraver, designer, pastellist, watercolorist
Slobodan Pajic (1943–), painter, media artist, installation artist
René-Louis Baron (1944–2016), conceptualist, algorithmic music composer
Christian Boltanski (1944–2021), painter, photographer, other media, sculptor
Jacques Pellegrin (1944–2021), painter
Henri Richelet (1944–2020), painter
Thierry Agullo (1945–1980), mixed media
Jean-Yves Lechevallier (1946–), sculptor
Gérard Garouste (1946–), sculptor, painter, other media
Jean-Marie Poumeyrol (1946–), painter 
Denis Schneider (1946–), painter
Yves Hayat (1946–), painter
Orlan (1947–), performance artist, body artist
Champion Métadier (1947–), visual artist
Bracha L. Ettinger (1948–) (born in Tel Aviv), painter, photographer, new media, artists' books
Guillerm Zamor (1951–), painter, sculptor, writer
Thibaut de Reimpré (1949–), abstract painter
Claude-Max Lochu (1951–), painter
Pierre Toutain-Dorbec (1951–), painter, sculptor, photographer, writer
Jean-Marc Bustamante (1952–), painter, sculptor, photographer
Hélène Agofroy (1953–), contemporary artist
Vanilla Beer (1953–), painter, daughter of Anthony Stafford Beer
Thierry Bisch (1953–), painter
Bernard Frize (1954–), painter
Michel Mimran (1954–)
Jean Paul Leon (1955–), painter, sculptor, writer
Joel Ducorroy (1955–), licence plate artist
Patrick Moya (1955–), painter, sculptor, media artist (see :fr:Patrick Moya)
Patrick Mimran (1956–), multimedia artist
Michel De Caso (1956–), painter, sculptor
Robert Combas (1957–), painter
Maurice Benayoun (aka MoBen) (1957–), media artist
Pascal Lecocq (1958–) painter, set designer
Emmanuel Flipo (1958–), painter
Thierry Noir (1958–), artist and muralist
Hervé Di Rosa (1959–), painter
Zaven Paré (1961–), new media artist
Victor Orly (1962–), (lives and works in Marseilles), painter, ceramist
Pierre Huyghe (1962–), media, film, video
Bibi (1964–), installation artist
Damien Valero (1965–), mixed media artist
Manu Farrarons (1967–), tattoo artist, graphic designer, illustrator, other media
Lionel Estève (1967–), (lives and works in Brussels), sculpture and installation artist
Béatrice Cussol (1970–), watercolor, drawing, mural
Elsa Dax (1972–), painter
Jean-François Batellier (1974–), caricaturist and cartoonist
Abdelkader Benchamma (1975–), drawings, sculptor
Morgane Tschiember (1976–), sculptor, video artist
Y Liver (1977–) (lives and works in Paris), video maker and performance artists
Oriane Lassus (1987–), cartoonist and illustrator
Seb Toussaint (1988–), artist and muralist
Natalie d'Arbeloff, cartoonist and painter
Bazévian Delacapucinière, painter

French photographers

Eugène Atget (Jean-Eugène Auguste Atget) (1857–1927)
Brassaï (Gyula Halasz) (1899–1984) (born in Hungary)
Hippolyte Bayard (1807–1887)
Adeline Boutain (1862–1946), photographer, postcard publisher
Adolphe Braun (1812–1877)
Alexandra Boulat (1962–2007), photographer
Sophie Calle (1953–), other media, photographer
Henri Cartier-Bresson (1908–2004)
Louis-Jacques Daguerre (1787–1851)
Robert Doisneau (1912–1994)
Pierre Dubreuil (1872–1944), photographer
Philippe Echaroux (1983–)
Lucien Hervé (László Elkán) (1910–2007), photographer (born in Hungary)
Jacques Henri Lartigue (1894–1986)
Ange Leccia (1952–), photographer, filmmaker
Jean-François Lepage (1960–), photographer
Étienne-Jules Marey (1830–1904)
Charles Marville (1816–1879)
Nadar (Gaspard Félix Tournachon, called "Nadar") (1820–1910)
Joseph Nicéphore Niépce (1765–1833), inventor of photography
Pierre et Gilles (Pierre: 1949, Gilles: 1953), photographers (active since 1976)
Michel Poivert (1965–), photography historian, president of Société française de photographie
Herman Puig (originally from Cuba), photographer, filmmaker
Constant Puyo (1857–1933)
Marc Riboud (1923–2016), photographer
Georges Rousse (1947–), photographer
Bettina Rheims (1952–), photographer
Willy Ronis (1910–2009), photographer
Lise Sarfati (1958–), photographer
Jean-Louis Schoellkopf (1946–), photographer
Alex Strohl (1989–)
Jean-Baptiste Tournassoud (1866–1951), photographer and military officer
Pierre Toutain-Dorbec (1951–)
Xavier Veilhan (1963–), photographer, other media
Jean-Marie Villard (1828–1899)
Wols (Alfred Otto Wolfgang Schulze) (1913–1951) (German, worked in France), photographer

See also
Art history
European art history
History of painting
List of French painters

References

 
Lists of artists by nationality
Artists